João Henrique Pataco Tomás (born 27 May 1975) is a Portuguese retired professional footballer who played as a forward.

He represented mostly Braga (three seasons) and Rio Ave (four) during his 19-year senior career. In his only full season with Benfica he scored 17 goals in 31 games, going on to amass Primeira Liga totals of 261 matches and 98 goals over ten campaigns.

Abroad, Tomás spent some time in Spain and Asia.

Club career
Born in Oliveira do Bairro, Aveiro District, João Tomás achieved some notability playing for Académica de Coimbra, earning the nickname of O Jardel de Coimbra (Coimbra's Jardel) after Mário Jardel.

He subsequently played for S.L. Benfica, Real Betis – joining in summer 2001 alongside teammate José Calado, he scored seven La Liga goals in his debut season, but appeared scarcely in his second year – Vitória de Guimarães and S.C. Braga, to where he returned after a Qatari stint in 2006–07, where he represented Al-Arabi SC, netting eight times in seventeen games before switching to Al Rayyan SC in 2007, leaving for Asia for free.

In 2004–05 and the following campaign, while with Braga, Tomás was the second best goalscorer in the Primeira Liga. In 2007–08, however, he was very rarely used, due to injuries and the emergence of Austrian Roland Linz, and would sign in July 2008 with Boavista FC, relegated after irregularities to the second division.

Two matches into the 2008–09 season, Tomás entailed negotiations with another Qatari club, Al-Ahli (Doha), but quickly returned to Boavista. In June 2009, as his team suffered a second consecutive drop, he left for Rio Ave F.C. at age 34.

João Tomás fared well in his return to the top level, scoring six goals in the league and eight overall, but moved abroad once again in February 2010, joining United Arab Emirates side Al-Sharjah SCC. In July he returned to Rio Ave, signing a one-year contract.

On 30 October 2010, 35-year-old Tomás scored in a 2–0 home win against former club Braga, as Rio Ave won its first game of the campaign – earlier, in the first half, he missed a penalty kick. In the first year in his second spell in Vila do Conde he finished second in the goal scorers chart, only trailing FC Porto's Hulk.

Tomás moved abroad again in January 2013, penning a contract with C.R.D. Libolo in Angola.

International career
João Tomás played four times for Portugal. His first game was in a 2–1 win over Israel in a friendly match, on 15 November 2000.

On 22 May 2007, after a -year absence, Tomás was recalled to the national team by Luiz Felipe Scolari, playing in a 1–1 draw with a Kuwaiti club on 5 June in Kuwait City and scoring the Portuguese goal.

Career statistics

References

External links

1975 births
Living people
People from Oliveira do Bairro
Portuguese footballers
Association football forwards
Portugal international footballers
Primeira Liga players
Liga Portugal 2 players
Anadia F.C. players
Associação Académica de Coimbra – O.A.F. players
S.L. Benfica footballers
Vitória S.C. players
S.C. Braga players
Boavista F.C. players
Rio Ave F.C. players
La Liga players
Real Betis players
Qatar Stars League players
Al-Arabi SC (Qatar) players
Al-Rayyan SC players
UAE Pro League players
Sharjah FC players
Girabola players
C.R.D. Libolo players
Portuguese expatriate footballers
Expatriate footballers in Spain
Expatriate footballers in Qatar
Expatriate footballers in the United Arab Emirates
Expatriate footballers in Angola
Portuguese expatriate sportspeople in Spain
Portuguese expatriate sportspeople in Qatar
Portuguese expatriate sportspeople in the United Arab Emirates
Portuguese expatriate sportspeople in Angola
Sportspeople from Aveiro District